Cydippe is a genus of ctenophores belonging to the order Cydippida, family unassigned.

The species of this genus are found in Europe.

Species:

Cydippe densa 
Cydippe hormiphora 
Cydippe ovata

References

Ctenophores